The Sarajevo Operation was an operation by the Yugoslav Partisan Army which led to the liberation of Sarajevo and Central Bosnia in March-April 1945.

The Battle 

The German defense plan for Yugoslavia of 22nd of February 1945 had named Sarajevo as a fortified city, which could only be abandoned by direct permission from Adolf Hitler. 
By 20th of March, the failure of Operation Spring Awakening (the German offensive in Hungary) and the successful offensive of the Yugoslav 4th Army in Lika (North-Western Croatia), made holding Sarajevo pointless. The retreat was ordered, with 3000 wounded German soldiers from the Sarajevo hospital going first.
Interception of Yugoslav wireless communications had revealed to the Germans that the general attack was planned for 28th of March. In order to secure their retreat routes, the German Army carried out the Berggeist, Maigewitter and Osterglocke Operations.

On 28th of March 1945, the Yugoslav Army launched its attack. Under command of the Operational HQ for Liberation of Sarajevo were the 2nd, 3rd and 5th Corps of the Yugoslav army, supported by the 11th and 13th Krajina and 18th Central Bosnian Brigade, an Artillery Brigade and a Tank Company. The overall commander was the commander of the 2nd Corps Radovan Vukanović. Sarajevo and its surrounding areas was defended by German and NDH forces under command of the German 21st Mountain Corps.

After heavy fighting, the city of Sarajevo was liberated on 6th of April. 

During the pursuit of the enemy, Yugoslav units liberated Visoko, Kakanj and on 10th of April Busovača, which concluded the Sarajevo operation.

Order of battle

Axis
 XXI Mountain Corps (Ernst von Leyser)
 7th SS Volunteer Mountain Division Prinz Eugen
 369th (Croatian) Infantry Division
 181st Infantry Division
 9th Mountain Ustashe Home Guard Division (5 brigades)
  Romanija, Zenica and Herzegovina Chetnik Corps.

Partisans
2nd Corps (Radovan Vukanović) 
3rd Division
29th Division
37th Division
3rd Corps (Pero Kosorić) 
27th Division
38th Division
5th Corps (Slavko Rodić) 
4th Division
10th Division
Zenica Combat Group

See also
Walter Defends Sarajevo

Sources
Sarajevo Operation

Conflicts in 1945
1945 in Yugoslavia
Battles of World War II involving Chetniks
Battles involving the Yugoslav Partisans
Battles of World War II involving Germany
Battles involving the Independent State of Croatia
March 1945 events
April 1945 events